is a railway station in Shibuya, Tokyo, Japan, operated by the private railway operator Keio Corporation.

Lines
Sasazuka station is served by the Keio Line and Keio New Line.

Station layout
The station has two elevated island platforms serving four tracks.

Platforms

History
Sasazuka Station opened on 15 April 1913.

References

External links

 Keio station information 

Keio Line
Keio New Line
Stations of Keio Corporation
Railway stations in Tokyo
Railway stations in Japan opened in 1913